The Morton National Park is a  national park located in the Southern Highlands, South Coast and Illawarra regions of New South Wales, Australia, situated approximately  south southwest of Sydney.

Location and features
The most notable attractions are the Fitzroy Falls that are located adjacent to the main road linking the Southern Highlands with the upper South Coast and lower Illawarra regions, via Kangaroo Valley; and the Pigeon House Mountain that is located west of Milton. The National Parks & Wildlife Servicemanaged park consists mostly of a flat plateau dissected by steep gorges, tilting gently to the northeast. The boundaries of the park extend from Bundanoon south to the west of Ulladulla and the park contains part of the Budawang Range. To the south of the park is the adjacent Budawang National Park. In the north section of the park, the Fitzroy Falls and the Belmore Falls plunge off the plateaux into rainforest gullies. The Shoalhaven River flows in the north and northwest sections of the park.

History 
The Morton National Park was opened in 1938 and was named after Mark Morton, a state legislative assembly member, who passionately advocated for its establishment. It is estimated to have been inhabited by the aboriginal people almost 20,000 years ago. The Yuin people attach great significance to the park and its surrounding areas along with the Didthul mountain, which is a part of the aboriginal mythology.

See also
 Fitzroy Falls, New South Wales
 Protected areas of New South Wales (Australia)

References

External links
Fitzroy Falls

National parks of New South Wales
South Coast (New South Wales)
Protected areas established in 1967
1967 establishments in Australia
Southern Tablelands